Josephine is an unincorporated community in Indiana County, Pennsylvania, United States. Josephine has a post office, with ZIP code 15750.

References

Unincorporated communities in Indiana County, Pennsylvania
Unincorporated communities in Pennsylvania